Yarnton Junction was a three-platform station serving the village of Yarnton, Oxfordshire. It was built in 1861 at the junction of the Oxford, Worcester and Wolverhampton Railway and Witney Railway, north of Oxford. British Railways closed the station to passengers in 1962 and it was demolished .

History

By this time, the OW&WR had merged with the Worcester and Hereford Railway and the Newport, Abergavenny and Hereford Railway to become, as of 14 June 1860, the West Midland Railway (WMR). It was leased by the Great Western Railway for 999 years from 30 May 1861 and was taken over by this company from 1 August 1863. According to Sir Charles Fox, the engineer engaged by the Witney Railway to survey their line, the OW&WR had given an undertaking to build a station at Yarnton and to stop their trains to connect with services on the branch line. It was proposed that all Witney services would terminate at Yarnton, where "a fine new inter-change station" would be built providing connections to Worcester, Oxford, Witney and Euston. However, after the WMR had settled its differences with the Great Western and agreed to be leased by it in 1861, the through service from Worcester to Euston had been withdrawn from September and there was no need for a grand station at Yarnton.

The station was therefore incomplete when opened on 14 November 1861 and it was not until Summer 1863 when its three platform faces and run-round loop for branch services were finished. There was no goods yard or loading facilities, although there were two sidings on the Up side which served a WMR "ballast field", which may have been used for the construction of the Witney Railway. The station building itself was a large two-storey Gothic structure to the north of the Up platform. An ornate waiting shelter with seats on both sides stood on the down platform which was built as an island with tracks on both sides. The lack of structures on the Up platform may be explained by the fact that the WMR had intended to provide two island platforms with four faces. The main station building was demolished not long after opening and a basic wooden hut was thereafter constructed on the Up platform, adjacent to which was a graceful wood-and-iron gentlemen's urinal. To the south of the platforms, the Yarnton Loop diverged eastwards to join the L&NWR at Oxford Road junction. There was no road access to the station and passengers reached it via a long unlit footpath close to the graveyard of St Bartholomew's Church.

A house was provided for the railwayman in charge of the station; it was unusual in that it was built right next to the main line tracks. During the Second World War, works were carried out at Yarnton Junction to increase its capacity to deal with wartime traffic. A marshalling yard comprising nine long sidings was brought into use on 20 August 1940 to handle freight transfers; it was retained after the war to re-marshal ironstone trains from the East Midlands via , eventually closing on 6 July 1966. The yard had a large turntable and shunters' accommodation.

On 18 June 1962 British Railways withdrew passenger services from the Fairford branch and closed Yarnton station. The line from Yarnton to Witney remained open for goods traffic until 2 November 1970. The connection at Yarnton with the main line was taken out shortly after final closure. The Yarnton Loop had closed earlier on 8 November 1965.

Signalling
Two signal boxes were in use at Yarnton by the 1880s. The first, Yarnton Witney Junction Box, controlled the Yarnton Loop and the junction between the OW&WR and the Witney Railway. This was a 50-lever "pedestal" box situated to the southern end of the Down platform, to the left of which were nine long sidings brought into use on 20 August 1940 and which were retained after the war to re-marshal ironstone trains from the East Midlands via , eventually closing on 6 July 1966. The second was Yarnton Oxford Road Junction.

These were replaced on 13 June 1909 by a single box. This was a power signalling box which did not rely on the signalman's muscle power to operate points and signals. 120 V motors were used with signals being held in the "off" position by electromagnets. 50 miniature levers were provided in the box to operate the points and signals. The frame was constructed by McKenzie and Holland at a cost of £2,800. This was the second power signalling installation on the GWR and lasted for twenty years until replaced by a conventional mechanical signalling system on 30 July 1929. The signal box finally closed on 28 March 1971.

Routes

Present day
At Yarnton Junction, the only remaining relic is the turntable pit. The area to the south of the line at this point is used for gravel extraction.

Railway Reopening
In February 2015, the Witney Oxford Transport Group proposed the reopening of the station as an alternative to improvements to the A40 road proposed by Oxfordshire County Council.

There is a strong case to reopen the railway given the severe traffic congestion on the roads to and from Oxford.

References

Notes

Sources

External links

 Station on 1947 OS Map
Archived page with post-closure details of stations

Former Great Western Railway stations
Disused railway stations in Oxfordshire
Railway stations in Great Britain opened in 1861
Railway stations in Great Britain closed in 1962
1861 establishments in England